John Klass (born February 6, in Singapore) is a singer/producer/songwriter/radio presenter.

Biography 
John Klass has been in the entertainment scene since 1991.
 
As singer-songwriter, John first got public attention as lead singer with the group KICK! (Winner for Best Local Group! & Best local song “Jane” in the Music Awards 1994). The group performed in front of capacity crowds of 40,000 to 60,000 people in Kuala Lumpur & Malacca respectively.

As a soloist, wrote & produced the soundtrack of The Teenage Textbook Movie. He scored a string of No.1 songs on the airplay charts across Singapore including an update of the ABBA classic "Honey Honey", a duet with a popular local TV actress Jamie Yeo.

In 1995, John starred in Singapore’s first English Drama Series Masters Of The Sea, the first English-language drama on Asian television.

In 1997, he represented Singapore to sing in the ASEAN Song Festival.

In 2000, John picked up an award for Best Local Song ("Falling in Love") at the Radio Music Awards.

In 2002, John released a single produced by Richard Niles and recorded on London; the song – "Believing in Fergie’s Fighters" – is a tribute to the undying spirit of Sir Alex Ferguson’s Manchester United. John received a personal letter from Sir Alex Ferguson thanking him for the song.

In 2003, John was commissioned by Red Cross Society to write/produce a national tribute song to the doctors and nurses who put their own lives on the line to save the lives of the sufferers of the deadly SARS virus. The tribute song “Thru Your Eyes” went triple platinum in Singapore and was featured on the BBC World Service and ITV news.

The monies collected from the CD sales went on to contribute to the needs of the families who lost the loved ones to SARS.

John has starred in many Television programmes & hosted the Kids entertainment pop TV show OK! He also wrote all the original songs for 2 seasons of KIDS POP Show OK! then went on to write, sing & produce over 200 kids songs for the kids TV show “In Our House”

In 2006, John set up KLASS INTERNATIONAL with his wife Valerie, which gave birth to the brand iPOP (i Prepare Opportunities to Present you).

In 2012, John's band, The Professionals, was invited to perform in Cannes, France, where the band received raves for their performance.

John was also the creative and musical director for 'The Singapore Showcase' at MIDEM in Cannes.

Disney Asia whereby commissioned him to write and produce for Mickey Safety House.

Fremantle Asia also commissioned John Klass to write the theme song Sing to Win.

In May 2013, John Klass was invited to helm the evening drive time belt on Kiss 92FM after a 15-year break from being a radio personality. His show shot to being the number 1 evening drive time show within 3 months and has continued to be the number 1 drive time radio show in Singapore. In addition, he also helms the evening-nighttime belt during Weekends on Kiss 92.

Due to his popularity on Kiss 92, John was invited by International Radio Festival to represent Singapore in Zurich in 2014. He broadcast his live radio show for a week in Zurich.

In 2014, John released a new single, The Point, that garnered more than 150,000 views on Youtube.

In September 2017, he left Kiss 92 to join Mediacorp. He is now a radio celebrity on Class 95.

As John Klass is a well-known name and brand, he was invited to collaborate with Piccadilly Tailors to launch a stylish fashion line specialising in bespoke suits called JOHN KLASS SUITS. This popular brand is now located on the 2nd floor of Far East Plaza.

In Nov 2017, John Klass had his first sold-out, solo concert at Esplanade Recital Studio. His band, Kick!, made a guest appearance. His concert drew world wide audiences from Canada, USA, Brazil, Indonesia, UK, Philippines, India, among others via Facebook Live.

In Jan 2018, John Klass was invited by Base Entertainment Asia to be their guest performer at the official '007 in concert' direct from London. This was to celebrate and commemorate 50 years of James Bond movies. John Klass was backed by an explosive 28-piece orchestra and band from London and Singapore. This concert took place at The MasterCard Theatres at Marina Bay Sands.

Currently, John is helming the all New Love Songs on Class 95 from 8 pm - midnight.

Discography 
 Freedom in Me (KICK!)
 Jane (KICK!)
 Chains of Pain (KICK!)
 Its now or Never (KICK!)
 Falling in Love
 When things seem so wrong
 Honey Honey
 Believing in Fergie's Fighters
 Shame Shame Shame
 Funk it Up
 Heaven Knows
 Sins
 Under the Moon
 Citizens
 The Point
 I Just Fall In Love Again

Instrumentation  
 Vocals
 Keyboards
 Guitar
 Bass
 Drums

References

External links
 iPOP Website
 Klass International
 John Klass Music
 About John Klass Video

1975 births
Living people
21st-century Singaporean male singers
Singaporean composers
Multi-instrumentalists
Singaporean radio producers
Singaporean radio presenters
Singaporean record producers
20th-century Singaporean male singers